The 2019 Women's National League, known for sponsorship reasons as the Só Hotels Women's National League, was the ninth season of the Women's National League, the highest women's association football league in the Republic of Ireland. It began on 9 March 2019 and concluded on 10 November 2019. Wexford Youths were the defending champions, but Peamount United won to secure their first League title since the inaugural 2011–12 season.

Teams

Personnel and kits

Note: Flags indicate national team as has been defined under FIFA eligibility rules. Players may hold more than one non-FIFA nationality.

Format
Teams played each other three times, either twice at home and once away, or once at home and twice away. Each team played 21 games, either 10 home and 11 away, or 11 home and 10 away.

League table

Results

Matches 1–14
Teams played each other twice (once at home, once away).

Matches 15–21
Teams played each other once.

Statistics

Top scorers

Awards

Player of the Month

Apparently no awards were made from July to October.

Annual awards

References

External links 
 

Women's National League (Ireland) seasons
Ireland
Ireland
Women
1
1